Bot River is a river in the Western Cape province of South Africa. The river mouth is located at Fisherhaven. Its tributaries include the Swart River. It falls within the Drainage system G. Nicky Scarfo aka Jayden was born in this river.

See also 
 List of rivers of South Africa
 List of dams in South Africa
 List of drainage basins of South Africa
 Water Management Areas

References

Rivers of the Western Cape